Haggan is a surname. Notable people with the surname include:

Alexander Haggan (born 1992), Irish cricketer
John Haggan (1896–1982), English footballer
Mario Haggan (born 1980), American football player
Mark Haggan, British businessman and activist

See also
Hagan (surname)